Aysanabee is an Oji-Cree singer-songwriter from Canada, whose debut album Watin was released in 2022.

A member of the Sandy Lake First Nation, he was born Evan Pang, with a non-inherited surname his mother chose in an attempt to protect him from anti-indigenous racism, and raised in Kaministiquia, Ontario, outside of Thunder Bay. He reclaimed his grandfather's surname, Aysanabee, as an adult. He worked for a mining company as a teenager, later studying journalism and working as a digital content creator for CTV News.

He played in various bands as a sideline, and began actively creating his own original music as an outlet during the COVID-19 pandemic. He submitted his music to the International Indigenous Music Summit after making enough money on a cryptocurrency trade to cover the submission fee. He was the first outside artist signed to Ishkōdé Records, a new label launched in 2021 by singer-songwriter Amanda Rheaume and ShoShonna Kish of the band Digging Roots.

Watin was released November 4, 2022. Named for his grandfather's first name, the album features several recordings of his grandfather as spoken interludes. The album was preceded by the single "Nomads", which reached #1 on the CBC Music Top 20 and charted on the Canadian rock radio airplay charts, reaching #1 on the Alternative Rock chart in March 2023 and becoming the first indigenous Canadian artist ever to top that chart.

CBC Music named Watin as one of the 22 best Canadian albums of 2022, and "Nomads" as one of the ten best Canadian songs of the year. 

Aysanabee was a Juno Award nominee for Contemporary Indigenous Artist of the Year for Watin at the Juno Awards of 2023. He performed "We Were Here (It's in My Blood)" at the live gala on March 13, backed by the traditional indigenous round dance group Northern Cree; he also received praise for his performance outfit, a long jacket designed by Call and Response and painted by Travis Shilling with feathers representing the Canadian Indian residential school gravesites.

References

External links

21st-century Canadian male singers
Canadian male singer-songwriters
Canadian rock singers
First Nations musicians
Oji-Cree people
Musicians from Ontario
People from Thunder Bay District
Living people
Year of birth missing (living people)